Zomura Manezo is a Ugandan politician and member of the parliament. She was elected in office as a woman Member to represent Obongi district located in the Northern part of Uganda during the 2021 Uganda general elections.

She is a member of the ruling National Resistance Movement party.

See also
 List of members of the eleventh Parliament of Uganda
 Parliament of Uganda

References

Members of the Parliament of Uganda
Women members of the Parliament of Uganda
Living people
21st-century Ugandan women politicians
21st-century Ugandan politicians
Year of birth missing (living people)